Edgar Sneed Jr. (born August 6, 1944) is an American professional golfer, sportscaster and course design consultant, who played on the PGA Tour and the Champions Tour.

Sneed was born in Roanoke, Virginia. He graduated from Ohio State University and was a member of the golf team. He turned pro in 1967. He worked briefly at Scioto Country Club in Columbus, Ohio, the same golf course where Jack Nicklaus learned to play golf.

Sneed won four PGA Tour events during his career. His first professional win, however, was in Australia. On October 14, 1973 he won the Australian Tour's New South Wales Open by two strokes over Australian Bob Shearer. One shot back of Shearer on the 17th, Sneed finished eagle-par to defeat Shearer by two shots. The very next week, on October 21, 1973, he won his first PGA Tour tournament at the Kaiser International Open Invitational. He defeated U.S. Open runner-up John Schlee in a playoff. A year later he was a wire-to-wire winner at the Greater Milwaukee Open. Sneed was a member of the Ryder Cup team in 1977. He had 46 top-10 finishes in his career on the PGA Tour.

Sneed is best known for his performance at the 1979 Masters Tournament. He began Sunday's round with a 5-stroke lead. He had a 3-stroke lead with three holes to play but bogeyed them all. He went into a sudden-death playoff with Tom Watson and Fuzzy Zoeller, but lost to Zoeller on the second hole. This was the first time the Masters used a sudden-death format to decide the Championship.

He finished runner-up on the European Tour's 1979 Irish Open and won the unofficial 1980 Morocco Grand Prix over Lee Trevino. Sneed's last win was at the 1982 Michelob-Houston Open. Like his first official win,  defeated Bob Shearer down the wire (this time in a playoff).

Sneed made his debut on the Senior PGA Tour in 1994 upon reaching the age of 50. His best finish in this venue is a T-5 at the 1995 Bell Atlantic Classic.

Sneed worked for eight years as a golf broadcaster for ABC television and was with CNBC in 2001. He has also done some course design consulting. He lives in Palm Harbor, Florida. He plans on providing golf instruction with director of golf, Larry Dornisch, at Muirfield Village Golf Club in Dublin, Ohio.

Amateur wins
1965 Ohio Intercollegiate

Professional wins (8)

PGA Tour wins (4)

PGA Tour playoff record (3–1)

PGA Tour of Australasia wins (1)

Other wins (3)
1972 Maumelle Open
1978 Jerry Ford Invitational (tie with Dale Douglass)
1980 Hassan II Golf Trophy

Results in major championships

CUT = missed the half-way cut
"T" indicates a tie for a place

Summary

Most consecutive cuts made – 8 (1978 PGA – 1980 PGA)
Longest streak of top-10s – 1 (twice)

See also 

 Fall 1968 PGA Tour Qualifying School graduates

U.S. national team appearances
Professional
Ryder Cup: 1977 (winners)

References

External links

American male golfers
Ohio State Buckeyes men's golfers
PGA Tour golfers
PGA Tour Champions golfers
Ryder Cup competitors for the United States
Golf writers and broadcasters
Golfers from Virginia
Golfers from Florida
Sportspeople from Roanoke, Virginia
People from Palm Harbor, Florida
Sportspeople from the Tampa Bay area
1944 births
Living people